Arto is a settlement on the right bank of the Sava River in the Municipality of Sevnica in central Slovenia. The area is part of the historical region of Lower Carniola. The municipality is now included in the Lower Sava Statistical Region.

Name
Arto was attested in historical sources as Ortt in 1433.

Cultural heritage
It now houses a retirement home.

References

External links
Arto at Geopedia

Populated places in the Municipality of Sevnica